Dead Obies is an experimental hip hop band originating from South Shore (suburbs south of Montreal), Quebec, Canada, that was formed in 2011 by a collective of five MCs: Jo RCA, Yes McCan, Snail Kid, 20SOME and O.G. Bear, and Quebec producer VNCE CARTER. The group identifies itself as post-rap. They are signed to the independent label Bonsound.

Dead Obies finished as Top 3 finalists at the Francouvertes de Montréal held in 2013 and designed for new music talents. The group has also taken part in Francofolies de Montréal, "WordUP! Battles" and "Artbeat" artistic events in Quebec. They use a mix of French, English, and French/English known as franglais in their songs. Their single "Do or Die + In America" was broadcast on French Canadian stations and the music video played on MusiquePlus .

They released their first mixtape in April 2012 titled Collation Vol. 1 followed by the album Montréal $ud (digital and vinyl format) in 2013.

In 2014, one year after the release of Montréal $ud, Dead Obies released the album in CD format and a book. In 2018, they received a Prix Iris nomination for Best Original Music for their work in the film Family First (Chien de garde).

Musical Style
The musical style of Dead Obies is often considered to be a blend of Québécois hip-hop and "post-rap". The group raps in both French and English (often referred to as franglais, and often switches languages in the middle of a sentence. This code-switching between the two languages is representative of the Montreal culture more broadly.

Discography

Albums
2013: Montréal $ud
2016: Gesamtkunstwerk
2019: DEAD.

EP
2017: "Air Max"

Mixtapes
2012: Collation Vol. 1
2014: Collation Vol. 2 – Limon Verde: La experiencia

Singles
2013: "Tony Hawk"
2013: "Montréal $ud"
2014: "Do or Die + In America"
2015: "Aweille !"
2015 : "Jelly"
2016: "Where They @"
2016: "Everyday" 
2016: "Explosif"
2016: "Waiting"
2017: "Monnaie"
2018: "Break"
2018: Run Away
2018: André
2019: Doo Wop

References

External links
Official website
Bonsound: Dead Obies page

Canadian hip hop groups
Musical groups established in 2011
Musical groups from Quebec
2011 establishments in Quebec